Norair Mikaelian  (born 18 September 1990), better known as Noel Gevor, is an Armenian-German professional boxer. He held the WBO Youth world and WBO International cruiserweight title in 2014 and 2016. He is the step-son of former European middleweight champion Khoren Gevor.

Professional career 
Gevor made his professional debut against Adam Gadajew on 27 May 2011. He won the fight on points after four rounds. Gevor amassed an 18–0 record during the next four years, before being booked to fight Daniel Alejandro Sanabria for the vacant WBO International cruiserweight title on 5 September 2015, the first regional championship of his career. He captured the vacant belt by unanimous decision, with scores of 99–90, 98–91 and 100–89. Gevor made his first title defense against Valery Brudov on 9 January 2016. He won the fight by unanimous decision, with two scorecards of 99–91 and one scorecard of 98–92. Gevor made his second title defense against Cristian Javier Medina on 7 May 2016. He won the fight by unanimous decision, with all three judges scoring the bout 98–92 in his favor. Gevor made his third title defense against Stephen Simmons on 14 October 2016. He won the fight by split decision, with scores of 116–112, 116–112 and 113–116.

On 28 April 2017, it was announced that Gevor would face Krzysztof Włodarczyk in an IBF cruiserweight title eliminator. The bout headlined a card which took place at the Hala Arena in Poznań, Poland on 20 May 2017. He lost the fight by split decision. One judge scored the bout 115–113 in his favor, while the remaining two judges scored it 116–112 and 115–114 for Włodarczyk.

Gevor faced the #1 seed of the 2018 World Boxing Cruiserweight Super Series on 10 November 2018, in the main event of an ESPN broadcast card, which took place at the Credit Union 1 Arena in Chicago, Illinois. Briedis won the fight by unanimous decision, with scores of 114–112, 115–111 and 116–110.

Gevor faced Jesse Bryan for the vacant WBC International cruiserweight title on 12 December 2020, following an eighteen-month absence from the sport. He won the fight by a fourth-round technical knockout. Gevor next faced the former WBA interim cruiserweight champion Youri Kalenga on 12 February, this time coming back from a fourteen-month absence from the sport. He won the fight by unanimous decision, with scores of 119–109, 118–108 and 117–111.

Professional boxing record

See also
Armenians in Germany

References

External links
 
Noel Gevor - Profile, News Archive & Current Rankings at Box.Live

Living people
1990 births
German male boxers
Armenian emigrants to Germany
Sportspeople from Yerevan
Cruiserweight boxers